Sean Paul Dabu Manganti (born April 18, 1994) is a Filipino-American professional basketball player for the Phoenix Super LPG Fuel Masters of the Philippine Basketball Association (PBA). He played college basketball for the Adamson Soaring Falcons of the University Athletic Association of the Philippines (UAAP). He plays at the small forward position.

College career

Adamson Soaring Falcons
Manganti led Adamson to three straight Final Four appearances under coach Franz Pumaren from 2016 to 2018.

Professional career

Manganti was picked eighth in the first round of the 2019 PBA Draft by NorthPort Batang Pier.

On November 5, 2021, Manganti, along with Sean Anthony and a 2021 second round draft pick, was traded to Phoenix Super LPG Fuel Masters for Michael Calisaan and Vic Manuel.

PBA career statistics

As of the end of 2021 season

Season-by-season averages

|-
| align=left | 
| align=left | NorthPort
| 11 || 18.5 || .268 || .226 || .619 || 2.9 || 1.5 || .4 || .4 || 4.5
|-
| align=left | 
| align=left | Phoenix
| 13 || 19.4 || .346 || .300 || .643 || 2.8 || .7 || .5 || .3 || 6.0
|-class=sortbottom
| align="center" colspan=2 | Career
| 24 || 19.0 || .313 || .272 || .629 || 2.9 || 1.1 || .5 || .3 || 5.3

Notes

References

1994 births
Living people
Adamson Soaring Falcons basketball players
American men's basketball players
American sportspeople of Filipino descent
Basketball players from San Diego
Filipino men's 3x3 basketball players
Filipino men's basketball players
Citizens of the Philippines through descent
Maharlika Pilipinas Basketball League players
NorthPort Batang Pier players
Small forwards
University of Maine at Presque Isle alumni
NorthPort Batang Pier draft picks
Phoenix Super LPG Fuel Masters players